"Sentimiento" is a song by the Colombian pop and electronic singer-songwriter Anasol. The song was released in 2005 as the first single from her third studio album, Anasol (2005). The song was written, produced and recorded by Anasol and David Cardenas, and the music video was directed by Gustavo Garzon.

Video

The music video shows Anasol in what seems to be a night club crowded with teenagers. The song is performed by Anasol in various places, angles and positions while she dances along. The music video was directed by the Argentine music video director Gustavo Garzón and first shown in May 2005.

Track listings
CD single
"Sentimiento (Album Version)"
"Sentimiento (Club Remix)"
"Sentimeinto (Club Remix Extended)"

Chart performance

Weekly charts

References

External links
Anasol official website
Univision Music Group: Anasol
Lyrics of "Sentimiento"

Anasol songs
Spanish-language songs
2005 singles
2005 songs